The  Georgia Force season was the seventh season for the franchise. Starting the season 3–5, the Force finished the regular season with 7 wins in their last 8 games, ending with a 10–6 record, and winning their second consecutive Southern Division title, allowing them to enter the playoffs as the 2nd seed in the National Conference. They were eliminated from the playoffs in their first playoff game of the season by the Cleveland Gladiators, by a score of 73–70.

Standings

Regular season schedule

Playoffs

Coaching

Roster

Stats

Regular season

Week 1: vs Dallas Desperados

Week 2: at Tampa Bay Storm

Week 3: vs. Los Angeles Avengers

Week 4: at Orlando Predators

Week 5: at Utah Blaze

Week 6: vs. Kansas City Brigade

Week 7
Bye Week

Week 8: vs. Orlando Predators

Week 9: at Arizona Rattlers

Week 10: vs. New Orleans VooDoo

Week 11: vs. Philadelphia Soul

Week 12: at New York Dragons

Week 13: at New Orleans VooDoo

Week 14: vs. Tampa Bay Storm

Week 15: at Columbus Destroyers

Week 16: vs. Chicago Rush

Week 17: at San Jose SaberCats

Playoffs

National Conference Divisional: vs. (4) Cleveland Gladiators

External links

Georgia Force
Georgia Force seasons
2008 in sports in Georgia (U.S. state)